Minister for Higher Education may refer to:
 Minister for Higher Education (Sweden)
 Minister for Higher Education (United Kingdom)
Minister for Higher Education (Scotland)